James Gore (1834 – 23 July 1917) was a 19th-century Member of Parliament from the Otago region of New Zealand, and Mayor of Dunedin.

He was Mayor of Dunedin from 1881 to 1882.

Gore died in Dunedin on 23 July 1917, and was buried at Dunedin Southern Cemetery.

References

1834 births
1917 deaths
Members of the New Zealand House of Representatives
Mayors of Dunedin
New Zealand MPs for Dunedin electorates
Unsuccessful candidates in the 1887 New Zealand general election
Unsuccessful candidates in the 1896 New Zealand general election
Burials at Dunedin Southern Cemetery
19th-century New Zealand politicians